Kintyre (also Campbell) is an unincorporated community in northeastern Emmons County, North Dakota, United States.  It lies northeast of the city of Linton, the county seat of Emmons County.  Its elevation is 1,900 feet (600 m).  The community was originally named Campbell for Dugald and Hugh Campbell, brothers who ranched there; it is now named Kintyre for the Kintyre Peninsula in Argyll, Scotland.  It has a post office with the ZIP code 58549.

Notable People

Thomas S. Kleppe, mayor and U.S Secretary of the Interior

References

External links
 Diamond jubilee :75th anniversary of Kintyre, North Dakota (1979) from the Digital Horizons website

Unincorporated communities in Emmons County, North Dakota
Unincorporated communities in North Dakota